John Louis Comiskey (August 12, 1885 – July 18, 1939) was an American businessman and the owner of the Chicago White Sox of the American League from 1931 to 1939.

Biography
He was born on August 12, 1885, son of Charles Comiskey. He inherited the team from his father in 1931. He started work for the White Sox in 1910.

Comiskey died of heart disease at the age of 53 on July 18, 1939.  Control of the White Sox passed to Comiskey's widow, Grace Comiskey, upon his death.

References

External links
J. Louis Comiskey - Baseballbiography.com

1939 deaths
Major League Baseball owners
Chicago White Sox owners
Chicago White Sox executives
Businesspeople from Chicago
1885 births
Comiskey family
20th-century American businesspeople